Marie-Anne is a Canadian drama film, directed by Martin Walters and released in 1978. The film is a historical biopic of Marie-Anne Lagimodière, the first woman of European descent to settle in Western Canada and the grandmother of Louis Riel.

The film stars Andrée Pelletier as Marie-Anne Lagimodière and John Juliani as her husband Jean-Baptiste Lagimodière. The cast also includes Tantoo Cardinal and Gordon Tootoosis.

The film garnered two Canadian Film Award nominations at the 29th Canadian Film Awards, for Best Actor (Juliani) and Best Actress (Pelletier).

References

External links

1978 films
1970s biographical drama films
Films shot in Alberta
Canadian biographical drama films
1978 drama films
1970s Canadian films